Blackfriars and Trinity is an electoral ward of Salford, England created by the Local Government Boundary Commission for England (LGBCE).

The first councillors for the ward were elected at the 2021 local elections.

Councillors 
The ward is represented by three councillors, each elected for a four-year term.

The current councillors for the ward are Jane Hamilton (Lab), Stephen Coen (Lab), and Roseanna Wain (Lab).

 indicates seat up for re-election.
 indicates seat won in by-election.

Elections in 2020s 
(*) denotes incumbent councillor seeking re-election.

May 2022

November 2021

May 2021

References



Salford City Council Wards